Stephen Baby (born January 31, 1980) is an American former professional ice hockey winger. He played in the AHL with the Chicago Wolves and Springfield Falcons.

Playing career
Baby was drafted in the seventh round, 188th overall, by the Atlanta Thrashers in the 1999 NHL Entry Draft. Drafted from the United States Hockey League's Green Bay Gamblers, Baby played four seasons with Cornell University before joining the Thrashers' American Hockey League affiliate, the Chicago Wolves, in the 2003–04 season.

Baby played with the Wolves for four seasons until being traded to the Tampa Bay Lightning organization, during the 2006–07 season, and being transferred to their AHL affiliate, the Springfield Falcons.

Baby graduated from Cornell University in 2003, where he was a member of the Quill and Dagger society.  While at Cornell a popular cheer for fans of the Big Red consisted of a parody of Bruce Channel's hit Hey! Baby with the lyrics changed to extol Baby's pugnacious nature on the ice. The tribute remains a common refrain in Lynah Rink to this day. The alternate lyrics sung by the fans are "Hey, Hey Bâby... I want to know .... Will you kill someone."

Career statistics

Awards and honors

References

External links

1980 births
American men's ice hockey right wingers
Atlanta Thrashers draft picks
Chicago Wolves players
Cornell Big Red men's ice hockey players
Green Bay Gamblers players
Ice hockey people from Chicago
Living people
Springfield Falcons players
AHCA Division I men's ice hockey All-Americans